Hans-Gerhart "Joscha" Schmierer (born 1 April 1942 in Stuttgart) is a German politician and author.

Life 
Schmierer was supposed to get a promotion and work with historian Werner Conze, but threw his supervisor in 1969 during a discussion meeting in the auditorium of the University of eggs [2], because this should have defended the actions of the armed forces in Eastern Europe. This ended Schmierers academic career.
In 1968, Schmierer was a member of the national board of the SDS; and in 1973 he became the co-founder of an important and the largest K group, the maoist Communist League of West Germany (KBW) until its dissolution in 1985. In December 1978, he traveled with a KBW delegation and visited the dictator Pol Pot in Cambodia as a gesture of solidarity.

In the second half of 1975, Schmierer was accused of a serious breach of the peace during a demonstration in 1970. He served two thirds of an eight-month prison sentence in the prison Waldshut. 
During his absence, Martin Fochler worked as a secretary of the Central Committee of the KBW. 

Within the radical Left of the 1970s, the tightly organized and dogmatic K-groups, like Schmierer's KBW in sharp opposition, were among the more so-called anarchist groups, including Joschka Fischer and Daniel Cohn Bendit owned group Revolutionary Struggle. Schmierer's KBW regarded this as "work-shy bon vivant" and threatened Cohn-Bendit with forced labor or capital punishment: "Either he is assigned a useful work of the working class, get about in a fishmeal factory in Cuxhaven, or it is during the revolution by the masses of the next tree promoted".

Despite his later pragmatism and its established position, Schmierer has never yet made a radical break with his previous positions. However, he attempts to reinterpret these fits into a certain continuity. He explained that he has always gone for democracy, and democracy - as Schmierer maintained in connection with the former discussion about the role of Joschka Fischer in violent demonstrations at the Tagesspiegel on 17 February, 2001 - is now once again no "Deckchensticken". The police, he pointed, is to blame for the escalation of violence at demonstrations.

References 

Living people
1942 births
Politicians from Stuttgart
20th-century German politicians
21st-century German politicians